is a Japanese animator, character designer, and animation director that gained popularity for his episode animation director work for the 1990s Sailor Moon anime series. His other notable works as a character designer includes Phantom Thief Jeanne, Toriko and Fresh Pretty Cure!.

Career
Hisashi Kagawa entered the anime industry in 1988, and provided various episode animation direction for the second season of Sally the Witch.

From 1992 to 1997, Kagawa then provided many key animations and episode animation direction for Sailor Moon series, and eventually provided character designs and animation direction for its two movies: Sailor Moon S: The Movie and Sailor Moon SuperS: The Movie.

After Sailor Moon had ended, from 1997 to 2008, Kagawa provided various episode animation direction for Revolutionary Girl Utena, and character designs for St. Luminous Mission High School,  Phantom Thief Jeanne, Bomberman Jetters, Saikano: The Last Love Song on This Little Planet, Tai Chi Chasers, Wangan Midnight and Glass Maiden.

In 2009, Kagawa provided the character designs for one of the Pretty Cure series, titled Fresh Pretty Cure!.

In 2011, Kagawa provided the character designs for Toriko series. In 2015, Kagawa provided character design and animation director for Pumpkin Kingdom's Treasure segment in Go! Princess Pretty Cure the Movie: Go! Go!! Gorgeous Triple Feature!!!.
In 2016, Kagawa provided the character design for Tiger Mask W, and that same year, Kagawa provided the animated attack sequence for Come Back! Shuriken Sentai Ninninger: Ninnin Girls vs. Boys FINAL WARS live-action sentai film.

In 2020, Kagawa provided the character designs for Oda Cinnamon Nobunaga series.

Works

TV Anime

Anime film

OVA (Original Video Animation)

Live-Action

References

External links
  on Twitter
 
 

1965 births
Living people
People from Ehime Prefecture
Japanese animators